Amos Mansdorf was the defending champion but lost in the first round to Michael Chang.

Boris Becker won in the final 6–4, 6–3, 6–3 against Stefan Edberg.

Seeds
A champion seed is indicated in bold text while text in italics indicates the round in which that seed was eliminated.

  Boris Becker (champion)
  Stefan Edberg (final)
  John McEnroe (semifinals)
  Brad Gilbert (quarterfinals)
  Michael Chang (quarterfinals)
  Aaron Krickstein (semifinals)
  Alberto Mancini (second round)
  Tim Mayotte (first round)

Draw

 NB: The Final was the best of 5 sets while all other rounds were the best of 3 sets.

Final

Section 1

Section 2

External links
 1989 Paris Open draw

Singles